Thomas Kurtz may refer to:

 Thomas E. Kurtz (born 1928), professor of mathematics and computer scientist
 Thomas G. Kurtz (born 1941), professor of mathematics and statistics
 Tom Kurtz, rhythm guitarist for the band Starstruck that recorded the hit song Black Betty#Ram Jam version